Philip Baker may refer to:

 Philip Baker (chess player) (1880–1932), Irish chess player
 Philip Baker (provost) (born 1523), provost of King's College, Cambridge
 Philip Baker (obstetrician), British obstetrician
 Philip Noel-Baker, Baron Noel-Baker (1889–1982), British politician, diplomat, academic and amateur athlete
 Pip and Jane Baker, British television writers

See also
Philip Baker Hall (born 1931), American actor
Phil Baker (disambiguation)